Harpadon translucens, the glassy Bombay duck, is a species of lizardfish that lives mainly in the Indo-West Pacific.

The glassy Bombay duck is known to be found in estuaries with a mix of salt and fresh waters. The glassy Bombay duck is found at a demersal depth range of about 1 – 75 m. This species is native to a tropical climate. It is commonly found in the areas of Indo-West Pacific, Arafura Sea, northwestern Australia, and Papua New Guinea. This species is known to occupy bays and estuaries. Another common name for this species is the ghost grinner.

References

Synodontidae
Fish described in 1889
Taxa named by William Saville-Kent